North Eastern Coalfields is a unit of Coal India Limited, which has its headquarters in Margherita in Assam. The unit came into existence in 1975 after nationalization of coal mines in India. It took over the private mines operating in the Northeastern states of India and at present has mines operating in states of Assam, Meghalaya, Nagaland and Arunachal Pradesh. At present there are five working mines – three underground and two opencast mines.

Collieries 
 Tikak colliery
 Ledo OCP
 Tirap Colliery
 Tipong Colliery

References

Coal companies of India
Companies based in Assam
Energy in Assam
Coal India subsidiaries
1975 establishments in Assam
Indian companies established in 1975